Waitane is a locality in the Southland region of New Zealand's South Island in the foothills of the Hokonui Hills. The nearest sizeable town is Mataura to the east, while the main city of Southland, Invercargill, is southwest.

References 

Populated places in Southland, New Zealand